Lectionary 313 (Gregory-Aland), designated by siglum ℓ 313 (in the Gregory-Aland numbering) is a Greek manuscript of the New Testament, on parchment. Palaeographically it has been assigned to the 14th-century. The manuscript has survived in a fragmentary condition.

Description 

The codex contains Lessons for selected days only from the Gospels of John, Matthew, Luke lectionary (Evangelistarium) with some lacunae.
It is written in Greek minuscule letters, on 209 parchment leaves, 2 columns per page, 21 lines per page. According to the CSNTM description the manuscript has 212 leaves. There are no interesting or significant images.

The codex contains the weekday Gospel Lessons (Evangelistarium) according to the Byzantine Church order.

History 

Gregory dated the manuscript to the 14th-century. It has been assigned by the Institute for New Testament Textual Research (INTF) to the 14th-century.

Of the history of the codex ℓ 313 nothing is known until 1864, when it was in the possession of a dealer at Janina in Epeiros. It was then purchased from him by a representative of Baroness Burdett-Coutts (1814–1906), a philanthropist, together with other Greek manuscripts (among them lectionaries ℓ 314 and ℓ 315) which were transported to England in 1870–1871.

The manuscript was added to the list of New Testament manuscripts by F. H. A. Scrivener (494) Caspar René Gregory (number 313e).

It used to be held in London (Burdett-Coutts II. 5). The codex is now housed in the University of Michigan Library (Ms. 33) in Ann Arbor.

The manuscript is not cited in critical editions of the Greek New Testament (UBS4, NA28).

See also 

 List of New Testament lectionaries
 Biblical manuscript
 Textual criticism
 Lectionary 228

Notes and references

Bibliography

External links 

 Images of lectionary 313 at the CSNTM

Greek New Testament lectionaries
14th-century biblical manuscripts
University of Michigan